Proplatyarthrus is an extinct genus of ground sloths of the family Megalonychidae, endemic to Chubut Province, Argentina in South America.

Taxonomy 
Proplatyarthrus was named and a talus bone described by Florentino Ameghino in 1905. It was assigned to Megalonychidae by Carroll in 1988.

References

Bibliography

Further reading 
 R. Hitz, M. Reguero, A. R. Wyss and J. J. Flynn. 2000. New interatheriines (Interatheriidae, Notoungulata) from the Paleogene of Central Chile and Southern Argentina. Fieldiana: Geology (New Series) 42:1-26

Prehistoric sloths
Oligocene xenarthrans
Oligocene genus extinctions
Oligocene mammals of South America
Deseadan
Tinguirirican
Paleogene Argentina
Fossils of Argentina
Fossil taxa described in 1905
Taxa named by Florentino Ameghino
Golfo San Jorge Basin
Sarmiento Formation